Deh-e Nazar Gargich (also Romanized as Deh-e Naz̧ar Gargīch; also known as Deh-e Naz̧ar Gargīj and Naz̧ar Gargīch) is a village in Jahanabad Rural District, in the Central District of Hirmand County, Sistan and Baluchestan Province, Iran. At the 2006 census, its population was 284, in 52 families.

References 

Populated places in Hirmand County